The Legendary Buster Smith is the debut and only solo album released by saxophonist Buster Smith, recorded and released in 1959. The album features five original compositions by Smith, alongside versions of "September Song" by Kurt Weill and "Organ Grinder's Swing" by Will Hudson.

Background
In 1959, after several years of suggestion by Atlantic Records, alto saxophonist Buster Smith put together a band to perform a session of Jazz pieces. The album was recorded in a single studio session on June 7, 1959 and was released the next month on August 15. The lineup featured mostly Dallas based musicians, including Smith's own brother Boston Smith.

The album was digitally remastered, remixed and produced in 1999 and released for the first time on compact disc on October 19 of that year.

Track listing
"Buster's Tune" – 3:35
"E Flat Boogie" – 6:53
"September Song" (Maxwell Anderson, Kurt Weill) – 3:52
"King Alcohol" – 4:34
"Kansas City Riffs" – 5:17
"Late Late" – 7:42
"Organ Grinder's Swing" (Will Hudson) – 6:35

All compositions by Buster Smith except as indicated.

Personnel

Performing musicians
Henry "Buster" Smith - Alto saxophone and guitar
Eddie Cadell - Tenor saxophone
Leroy "Hog" Cooper - Baritone saxophone
Charles Gillum - Trumpet
Clinton Smith - Trombone
Herman Flowers or Boston Smith - Piano
Josea Smith - Bass
Robert Cobbs - Drums

Production
Robert Sullivan - Engineer
Gunther Schuller - Liner notes
Donald Elfman - 1999 Reissue producer
Naomi Yoshii - 1999 Reissue producer

References

1959 albums
Buster Smith albums
Atlantic Records albums